Volikakis is a Greek surname. Notable people with the surname include:

Christos Volikakis (born 1988), Greek cyclist
Zafeiris Volikakis (born 1989), Greek cyclist, brother of Christos

Greek-language surnames